Mr. Sunshine is a 2018 South Korean television series written by Kim Eun-sook and directed by , starring Lee Byung-hun, Kim Tae-ri, Yoo Yeon-seok, Kim Min-jung, and Byun Yo-han. The series is set in Hanseong (present-day Seoul) in the early 1900s, and focuses on activists fighting for Korea's independence. The series aired every Saturday and Sunday on tvN starting from July 7, 2018, and ended on September 30, 2018. It premiered internationally on Netflix.

Upon its final broadcast, Mr. Sunshine was the third highest-rated drama in Korean cable television history, with the last episode reaching 18.129% and netting an average rating of 12.955%, the highest average rating ever recorded for cable television at the time. While it received critical acclaim for cinematography and storytelling, as well as its strong female characters and portrayal of the lower classes, the series also received a certain amount of criticism for what was perceived as inaccurate representation of historical facts, with some accusing it of being "pro-Japanese", while others argued that it actually enforced stereotypes of the Japanese as villains and the Americans as heroes.

Synopsis
Mr. Sunshine centres around Eugene Choi (Lee Byung-hun), who was born into slavery in Joseon. After escaping to the United States at the time of the 1871 Shinmiyangyo, he becomes a Marine Corps officer.

When he returns to Joseon for a mission, Eugene meets and falls in love with an aristocrat's granddaughter, Go Ae-shin (Kim Tae-ri), who is part of the Righteous Army. However, their love is challenged by their different classes and the presence of Kim Hui-seong (Byun Yo-han), a nobleman who has been Ae-shin's betrothed since childhood. Eugene also encounters Gu Dong-mae (Yoo Yeon-seok), a ruthless samurai, and Kudo Hina (Kim Min-jung), owner of the popular "Glory Hotel". At the same time, he discovers a plot by the Empire of Japan to colonize Korea and soon becomes embroiled in the fight for his birth country's sovereignty.

Historical background 
Unlike most sageuk dramas dealing with the Japanese occupation of Korea, Mr. Sunshine takes place before the Japanese annexation, in the late 19th and early 20th centuries. It has a heavy focus on the Righteous Army and depicts the lives of people who fought for Joseon's freedom. Real-life historical events such as Shinmiyangyo, the Spanish-American War, the assassination of Empress Myeongseong, the Russo-Japanese War, Gojong's forced abdication, and the Battle of Namdaemun are portrayed or mentioned.

Historical figures such as Emperor Gojong, Itō Hirobumi, Hayashi Gonsuke, Hasegawa Yoshimichi, Horace Newton Allen and the Five Eulsa Traitors appear as recurring characters, with others, such as Theodore Roosevelt, Ahn Chang-ho, Imperial Noble Consort Sunheon, Park Seung-hwan, and Frederick Arthur MacKenzie, also making cameo appearances.

Main historical events described in Mr. Sunshine 

 Battle of Ganghwa (1871): A major battle that occurred on June 10, 1871 between the United States and Joseon. On June 1, American ships came under fire when they entered the Ganghwa Straits to establish trade and ensure the safety of the shipwrecked sailors of the SS Sherman, which was destroyed by the Korean army. As a result of Joseon's refusal to apologize, on June 10, USS Palos and USS Monocacy fired their weapons against the Choji Garrison on Ganghwa Island. The incident is thoroughly portrayed in Mr. Sunshine, as one of its character, Jang Seung-gu, fought in the battle as a teen and lost his father. 
 Japan–Korea Treaty of 1905: Signed on November 17, 1905, this treaty effectively gave the Empire of Japan diplomatic control over Korea. While Mr. Sunshine does not depict the treaty and its effects in detail, it contains a scene in which Kim Hui-seong takes pictures of the pro-Japanese Korean officials.
 Battle of Namdaemun: Fought between the Korean and Japanese armies on August 1, 1907, the battle took place at the Namdaemun Gate, in Hanseong. It was caused by a revolt of the Korean army after an order of disbandment was issued through the Japan–Korea Treaty of 1907. In Mr. Sunshine, the battle scenes are extensively illustrated.

Cast

Main
 Lee Byung-hun as Eugene Choi / Choi Yu-jin
Kim Kang-hoon as child Eugene Choi / Choi Yu-jin
 as young Eugene Choi / Choi Yu-jin
 Captain of the United States Marine Corps and former Joseon slave. After witnessing his parents' deaths at the hands of their owner, Eugene manages to escape to the United States, where he becomes an officer in the U.S. Marine Corps and fights in the Spanish–American War in order to overcome racial discrimination. He later returns to Joseon on a diplomatic mission and falls in love with Go Ae-shin. Eugene has to choose between helping Ae-shin in her fight for independence or maintaining his neutral position as an US military officer.
 Kim Tae-ri as Go Ae-shin  
Heo Jung-eun as child Go Ae-shin
 An orphaned Joseon noblewoman and member of the Righteous Army. Her parents were independence fighters who died in Japan due to their colleague's betrayal. Ae-shin is raised by her paternal grandfather, Go Sa-hong, who helps her train as a sniper under Jang Seung-gu.
 Yoo Yeon-seok as Gu Dong-mae / Ishida Shō 
Choi Min-young as young Gu Dong-mae
 The son of a butcher who flees to Japan upon his parents' death and becomes a samurai and member of the Musin Society, which is part of Yakuza. Dong-mae believes that it is the unjust Korean social hierarchy that killed his parents and returns to Joseon with a mission of helping the Japanese overtake the country.
Kim Min-jung as Kudo Hina / Yi Yang-hwa 
 An influential widow who runs a hotel in Joseon. Her father, Yi Wan-ik, forced her to marry an old, rich Japanese man. Upon her husband's mysterious death, she inherited the "Glory Hotel" and successfully operates it on her own. In order to atone for her father's shameful misdeeds and to also find her mother, Hina helps Yi Jung-mun in the fight against the Japanese government and the pro-Japanese officials.
 Byun Yo-han as Kim Hui-seong

 A Joseon nobleman who is considered to be the richest after the emperor in terms of land ownership. Hui-seong is emotionally tormented by his grandfather's past and lives for over a decade in Japan to avoid marrying the woman his family chose for him.

Recurring

Joseon royal court and government
Lee Seung-joon as Emperor Gojong
Kang Yi-seok as young Gojong
 The ruler of Korea who desperately fights for the country's sovereignty.
Kang Shin-il as Yi Jung-mun
 An anti-Japanese minister loyal to the emperor. He secretly commands the Righteous Army.
Kim Eui-sung as Yi Wan-ik / Rinoie Hiroaki
 A selfish and cruel pro-Japanese official who killed Go Ae-shin's parents. The father of Kudo Hina, he soon becomes Joseon's Minister of Foreign Affairs.
 as Yi Deok-mun
 A pro-Japanese nobleman. Yi Wan-ik's assistant and the abusive husband of Go Ae-sun.
Choi Jin-ho as Yi Se-hun 
 The arrogant and corrupt Minister of Foreign Affairs whose actions indirectly led to the deaths of Eugene Choi's family.
Jung Hee-tae as Police Commissioner Jung
Shin Mun-sung as Postmaster Yoon
 as Doctor Matsuyama
 A Japanese doctor secretly working for Yi Wan-ik.
 as Ye Wan-yong
 An infamous pro-Japanese minister and part of the Five Eulsa Traitors.

Righteous Army
Kim Kap-soo as Hwang Eun-san
 A skilled potter who helped a young Choi Yu-jin flee to the United States. The leader of the Righteous Army. 
Lee Si-hoon as Yoshino Kō 
 A Japanese man working as an assistant for Hwang Eun-san.
Choi Moo-sung as Jang Seung-gu
Sung Yoo-bin as young Jang Seung-gu
 A gunman who trains Go Ae-shin to become a sniper. Due to a misunderstanding he initially despises the emperor, but eventually becomes the head of the palace guards to protect him.
Seo Yoo-jung as Hong-pa
 A skilled archer and rower. Jang Seung-gu's wife.
 Jang Dong-yoon as Jun-young
 A young nobleman eager to fight for Korea's sovereignty.
Oh Ah-yeon as So-ah
 A Korean-born geisha who is part of the Righteous Army.
 as Jeon Seung-jae
 A Righteous Army member and one of Ae-shin's parents close friends.
Ji Seung-hyun as Song Yeong
 A cousin of Go Ae-shin's mother. Served as a minister at the time of the Shinmiyangyo incident and now lives in Japan supporting the Righteous Army.
 as Yi Sang-mok
 A jige carrier and a Righteous Army member who was briefly captured by Gu Dong-mae.
Lee Soon-won as Park Mu-geol
 The bell keeper, who is secretly a member of the Righteous Army.
Lee Dong-hee as baker
 A Righteous Army member and the owner of a French bakery/candy store.
Park Sung-hoon as blacksmith
 A friend of Jang Seung-gu who is skilled in fixing machinery.

Japanese government and army
  as Itō Hirobumi
 The first Resident-General of Korea for the Empire of Japan.
 as Hayashi Gonsuke
 Minister and de facto leader of the Japanese legation.
Kim Nam-hee as Mori Takashi
 A Japanese colonel of noble blood. Sadistic and cruel, he has a heavy dislike for Joseon. Eugene was his neighbour in New York.
Gong Dae-yu as Sasaki Soyu
 An arrogant Japanese major serving under Mori.
Yoon Dae-yul as Hasegawa Yoshimichi
 The Japanese Governor-General of Korea under Itō Hirobumi.
Lee Jung-hyun as Second Sergeant Tsuda
 A fanatically loyal Japanese NCO officer who will lash out at anyone near him.
 as Second Sergeant Yamada
 A Japanese NCO officer.
 as Hyung-ki
 A Korean man who works as a translator in the Japanese legation.
Jeong Tae-ya as Suzuki
 A man working at the Japanese legation who develops an enmity with Gu Dong-mae.

Go family's household
 as Go Sa-hong
 Go Ae-shin's paternal grandfather. He was a great scholar and the emperor's teacher. A firm believer in the sovereignty of Joseon, he very reluctantly allows Ae-shin to join the Righteous Army.
Lee Jung-eun as Ms. Ham-an 
 Go Ae-shin's loyal maid.
Shin Jung-geun as Mr. Haeng-rang 
 Go Ae-Shin's man-servant.
Kim Na-woon as Madame Cho
 Go Ae-shin's paternal aunt and maternal figure.
Park Ah-in as Go Ae-sun
 Go Ae-shin's cousin and the first wife of Yi Deok-mun. Unable to bear a son, she is regularly abused by her husband.

American legation
David Lee McInnis as Kyle Moore
 A major in the United States Marine Corps who is both the direct supervisor and friend of Eugene Choi.
Jo Woo-jin as Im Gwan-su
 An English interpreter working at the American legation in Joseon. He later becomes an English translator for the emperor.
 as Son Do-mi
Kim Min-jae as adult Son Do-mi
 A young boy who works at the American legation, where he teaches hangul to Eugene Choi. Su-mi's younger brother.
Lorne Edward Oliver as Horace Newton Allen
 The corrupt American minister who considers Eugene Choi more Korean than American.

Kim Hui-seong's family
Kim Eung-soo as Kim Pan-seo
 A cruel and extremely wealthy nobleman responsible for the deaths of Eugene Choi's parents. Hui-seong's grandfather.
 as Kim An-pyeong
Lee Hak-joo as young Kim An-pyeong
Hui-seong's cowardly father.
Kim Hye-eun as Yun Ho-sun
Park Ji-yeon as young Yun Ho-sun
 Hui-seong's mother.
 Jung Min-ah as Yeon-ju
 Jun-young's sister and Hui-seong's wife.

People around Dong-mae
 as Yuzo
Gu Dong-mae's loyal subordinate in the Musin Society.
Kim Yong-ji as Hotaru
 A mute Japanese fortune-teller living with Gu Dong-mae.
Hakuryu as leader of the Musin Society

Glory Hotel employees
Shin Soo-yeon as Son Su-mi
 Do-mi's older sister who secretly holds a valuable object.
Kim Si-eun as Gwi-dan
 A maid at the Glory Hotel secretly working for Gu Dong-mae.

Others
 as Kim Yong-ju
 A former friend of Ae-shin's parents who betrayed them to Yi Wan-ik.
Kim Byung-chul as Il-sik
 A slave hunter who diverted and became the co-owner of a shop that takes care of any need.  
 as Chun-sik
 A slave hunter who diverted and became the co-owner of a shop that takes care of any need.
Jason Nelson as Joseph W. Stenson
 An American missionary. He helps Eugene escape to America and is a paternal figure to him.
Ariane Desgagnés-Leclerc as Stella
 An American missionary working as an English teacher in Joseon. 
 as Yun Nam-jong
 A student at Stella's English School who later becomes Hui-seong's assistant.

Special appearances
Lee Si-a as Choi Yu-jin's mother
 as Choi Yu-jin's father
Choi Jong-won as Grand Internal Prince Heungseon
 Emperor Gojong's father.
Yoon Kyung-ho as Jang Seung-gu's father
 A gunner killed during the Shinmiyangyo incident.
Im Se-mi as Gu Dong-mae's mother
Oh Min-ae as Mr. Im's wife
Shim Wan-joon as Gu Dong-mae's father
Kim Hyun as apothecary
Yoon Ji-on as military school student
Jin Goo as Go Sang-wan
 Go Ae-sin's father. Killed while plotting to assassinate Yi Wan-ik.
Kim Ji-won as Kim Hui-jin
 Go Ae-shin's mother who is killed by Yi Wan-ik.
 Kim Joo-ryoung as Imperial Noble Consort Sunheon
 Emperor Gojong's concubine and a close friend of Hina.
Park Jeong-min as Ahn Chang-ho
 A Korean independence activist living in America.

Production
Netflix has invested ₩30 billion in the series.
The series is the third collaboration between writer Kim Eun-sook and director , after Descendants of the Sun (2016) and Guardian: The Lonely and Great God (2016).
The drama marks film actress Kim Tae-ri's small-screen debut.
The drama was first pitched by Studio Dragon to SBS, but the latter passed on the project due to financial and advertising constraints. 
Kim Sa-rang was originally cast in the series, but backed out in February 2018 due to scheduling conflicts. She was replaced by Kim Min-jung. 
Filming began in September 2017 and took place in various parts of Korea including Busan, Daegu, Gokseong County, Gyeongju and Hapcheon County. Several sets solely devoted to the early 1900s setting of Korea were built on a 20,000 m2 site in Nonsan, South Chungcheong Province, and another indoor set was built on a 6,600 m2 site in Daejeon. 1000 extras were hired for a battle scene.
It was originally planned in 2009 to be a sports-themed period drama set in the 1920s and 1930s, also featuring an American lead character. Shin Woo-chul, Kim Eun-sook's collaborator for the "Lovers" trilogy, was attached to be the director at the time.

Episodes

Original soundtrack

The music was composed by Nam Hye-seung, who is known for her work on many Korean dramas. Mr. Sunshine's score was recorded at the newly opened Synchron Stage Vienna in Austria. Nam Hye-seung travelled to Vienna to attend the recording in person.
Part 1

Part 2

Part 3

Part 4

Part 5

Part 6

Part 7

Part 8

Part 9

Part 10

Part 11

Part 12

Part 13

Part 14

Part 15

Reception
Critics praised the drama for its "deep storytelling" and its ability to raise viewers' awareness of history. The Korea Times applauded the drama for shedding light on those deemed peripheral in society, such as women and the lower classes, and for successfully laying out contradictions and hope in the fast-evolving late Joseon period; it also praised the show's strong female characters. Time's Kat Moon chose the show as one of the 10 "Best Korean Dramas to Watch on Netflix" and argued, "Besides serving up stunning cinematography, the show introduces two of the most dynamic female leads from the K-drama world". Collider's Devon Forward listed it as one of the 28 "Best Korean Dramas on Netflix Right Now".

Criticism
Mr. Sunshine has been criticized by some for what was perceived as inaccurate portrayal of Joseon's culture. In particular, the character Gu Dong-mae, who is portrayed as a member of the Black Dragon Society, a pro-Japanese organization, was criticized, with many feeling that the series tried to justify his actions against Joseon. However, the series has also been criticized for the exact opposite: enforcing stereotypes of the Japanese as villains and the Americans as heroes.

The production house responded to the criticisms by stating that the organizations and characters portrayed in the series are fictional and that they will modify the character description of Gu Dong-mae accordingly. The Black Dragon Society was changed to a fictional organization, the Musin Society.

Viewership
At the time, Mr. Sunshine recorded the third highest ratings for cable television with its final episode reaching 18.129% and netting an average rating of 12.955%, which was the highest average rating ever recorded for cable television until the release of The World of the Married, in 2020.

An 8.9% viewership rating was recorded nationwide for the series' first episode. It became the highest premiere rating in the network's history and remained in this position for the next three years, until it was surpassed by Hospital Playlist 2.

The drama aired on a cable channel/pay TV which normally has a relatively smaller audience compared to free-to-air TV/public broadcasters (KBS, SBS, MBC and EBS).

Awards and nominations

References

External links
  
 
 
 

2018 South Korean television series debuts
TVN (South Korean TV channel) television dramas
Television shows written by Kim Eun-sook
South Korean historical television series
Television series by Studio Dragon
Television series by Hwa&Dam Pictures
Television series set in the Joseon dynasty
Television series set in the 1900s
2018 South Korean television series endings
Television series set in Korea under Japanese rule
Television series set in the Korean Empire
Korean-language Netflix exclusive international distribution programming